Antun (or Anton, also spelled Antol) Vramec (1538–1587/8) was a Croatian priest and writer. He wrote the first historical book in Slovene. As it was the second book written in the Kajkavian dialect, he was also a founder of the Kajkavian literature.

Life
Vramec was born in Ormož or its vicinity (Duchy of Styria) and died in Varaždin (Kingdom of Croatia). He studied theology in Vienna and in Rome. In 1567, he moved to Zagreb, where he was a canon. In 1571, he became the Archdeacon of Bexen. In 1573, he moved to Varaždin, where he was also the archdeacon. The arrival of Antun Vramec to Varaždin marked the emerging of the Varaždin literary circle to which Vramec belonged.

From 1578 until 1580, he was the parish priest in Brežice, and from 1580 until 1582 the archdeacon in Dubice. In 1582, all his honors were revoked from him, because he didn't want to recant his family. Despite his freethinking stance, his connection with the Protestant movement has not been confirmed.

Work
The first work by Vramec was a world chronicle titled Kronika vezda znovich zpravliena Kratka Szlouenzkim iezikom, published in Ljubljana (Laibach) in 1578. This was the first popular historical work written in a Slovene in the Habsburg lands. In 1586, Vramec published in Varaždin a book of sermons and comments titled Postilla po nedelne i po godovne dni na vse leto vezda znovič spravlena po Antonu Vramcu Svetoga pisma doktoru i cirkve varaždinske plebanušu. To suppress liturgical books published by the Protestant Reformation Vramec deliberately used simple language spoken by the population of Slavonia in his works . It is possible that Vramec's Postilla was published in 1586 in Varaždin to follow the orders of Juraj Drašković, the bishop of the Roman Catholic Archdiocese of Zagreb, who ordered publishing of new books to dispute writings of Mihajlo Bučić.

References

Sources

External links

1538 births
1580s deaths
16th-century Croatian Roman Catholic priests
Croatian writers
16th-century Croatian historians
People from Ormož